Susan and God is a 1940 American comedy-drama film released by Metro-Goldwyn-Mayer directed by George Cukor and starring Joan Crawford and Fredric March. The screenplay was written by Anita Loos and was based upon a 1937 play by Rachel Crothers. The supporting cast features Rita Hayworth and Nigel Bruce.

The film follows the story of a society matron whose newfound religious fervor changes the relationships around her.

Plot
Susan (Joan Crawford), a flighty society matron, returns from Europe earlier than expected waxing enthusiastic about a new religious movement. She is estranged from her intelligent and sensitive husband Barrie (Fredric March), who has been driven to drink by his wife's insensitivity, and she has neglected her introverted and maladjusted daughter Blossom (Rita Quigley). Barrie tries to meet her boat as it arrives in New York City, but she avoids him and absconds to the country home of her friend Irene Burroughs (Rose Hobart).

While at the house, her fervor and sermons alienate friends "Hutchie" and Leonora (Nigel Bruce and Rita Hayworth) by insisting Leonora leave her elderly husband and return to the stage. Susan also insults Irene by telling her that she's unsuited for her lover Mike (Bruce Cabot). While they all blow off Susan's musings, it sticks with them, and Barrie comes to the house to beg for forgiveness. He asks her to give him another chance for the sake of their daughter Blossom, and offers to finally grant Susan the divorce she seeks if he takes another drink. Susan consents and agrees to spend the summer with the family, thus making Blossom very happy. At first, Barrie is taken in by Susan's new passion, believing it is a sign of maturity, but he suffers disappointment when he realizes it is simply another manifestation of her shallowness. Gradually, Susan begins to understand the pain she has caused her family and determines to put her own house in order before meddling in the lives of others.

Cast
 Joan Crawford as Susan Trexel
 Fredric March as Barrie Trexel
 Ruth Hussey as Charlotte
 John Carroll as Clyde Rochester
 Rita Hayworth as Leonora
 Nigel Bruce as "Hutchie"
 Bruce Cabot as Michael
 Rose Hobart as Irene Burroughs
 Constance Collier as Lady Millicent Wigstaff
 Rita Quigley as Blossom Trexel
 Gloria DeHaven as Enid
 Richard Crane as Bob
 Norma Mitchell as Hazel Paige
 Marjorie Main as Mary Maloney
 Aldrich Bowker as Patrick Maloney

Production
The film Susan and God was based on Rachel Crothers' play Susan and God, which premiered in Princeton, New Jersey, then opened on Broadway on October 7, 1937 at the Plymouth Theatre. The original production, directed by John Golden and designed by Jo Mielziner, starred Gertrude Lawrence and ran for 288 performances. MGM reportedly paid $75,000 (USD) for the rights to the play. Crothers' play reportedly was inspired by Dr. Frank Buchman's Oxford Group, a religious movement of the 1930s.

It was intended as a vehicle for Norma Shearer, but the star refused to play the role of a mother with a teenage daughter. Greer Garson was considered for the role before it went to Joan Crawford.

Rita Hayworth was loaned to MGM for this film by her studio Columbia Pictures. This was Fredric March's return to film after a year and a half's absence appearing on the stage.

Reception
Variety noted "Joan Crawford provides a strong portrayal of Susan...George Cukor's direction highlights the characterizations he unfolds." Howard Barnes in the New York Herald Tribune wrote "[Crawford] is not entirely successful in blending silliness with romantic power."

Although well-reviewed, the movie failed to make a return on its budget; according to MGM records, it made $817,000 in the U.S. and Canada and $279,000 in other markets, resulting in a loss of $433,000.

Television
On June 7, 1938, an excerpt from Susan and God was the first Broadway play with its original cast to be broadcast on television. Station W2XBS used exact replicas of the stage sets, with Nancy Coleman, Gertrude Lawrence, and Paul McGrath appearing on the broadcast.

Home media
Susan and God was released on Region 1 DVD on April 6, 2010 from the online Warner Bros. Archive Collection.

References
Notes

External links
 
 
 
 
 
 1953 Best Plays radio adaptation of original play at Internet Archive

1940 films
American comedy-drama films
American black-and-white films
1940s English-language films
American films based on plays
Films directed by George Cukor
Films scored by Herbert Stothart
Metro-Goldwyn-Mayer films
1940 comedy-drama films
Films with screenplays by Anita Loos
1940s American films